The 2018 USAC Silver Crown Champ Car Series is the 47th season of Silver Crown racing under the USAC banner. The series will begin with the Phoenix Copper Cup at ISM Raceway on April 7, and will end with the 4 Crown Nationals at Eldora Speedway on September 22. Kody Swanson entered the 2018 season as the defending champion. Swanson won the 2018 season title, becoming a 4-time series champion. Swanson also joined Al Unser as one of the only two drivers in history to win four consecutive Hoosier Hundred races in a row in 2018. Swanson also became the all-time wins leader in Silver Crown at Salem with 24 wins.

Team & Driver Chart

Driver & Team Changes 
 - Chris Windom will run the full Silver Crown schedule in 2018 for Nolen Racing. Jerry Coons Jr., will also return to the team for the full season.
 - Austin Nemire will run the full Silver Crown schedule in 2018 for Nemire/Lesko Racing.

Schedule
The 2018 schedule features 6 pavement races and 5 dirt races. The entire season will have on-demand video coverage by Loudpedal.TV. Select races will be broadcast live online by Speed Shift TV. Eldora Speedway will broadcast the 4 Crown Nationals live on their streaming website.  Live radio coverage for most USAC National races is available on the USAC Racing App. BCSN would broadcast the Toledo race on delay. MavTV (in association with Speed51) would broadcast the Rich Vogler Classic at Lucas Oil Raceway on delay.

 - * will state if the race is a non points event, or a preliminary night.
 - ≠ will state if the race was postponed or canceled

Schedule notes and changes
 - 1 new asphalt race was added at Madison International Speedway on June 29.
 - Williams Grove Speedway would not return to the schedule in 2018. However, this would be only a 1-year hiatus as the track & USAC intends on the race returning to the schedule in 2019.
 - Rich Vogler Classic (September 8) at Lucas Oil Raceway at Indianapolis was canceled due to inclement weather.

Results and Standings

Races

Driver points

Source:

 Kody Swanson, 641
 Justin Grant, 559
 Chris Windom, 524
 David Byrne, 459
 Jerry Coons Jr., 433
 Kyle Robbins, 372
 Travis Welpott, 348
 Matt Goodnight, 344
 Bobby Santos III, 329
 Austin Nemire, 327

Owner points

 #63 DePalma Motorsports, 641
 #91 Hemelgarn Racing, 559
 #17 Nolen Racing, 524
 #40 Byrne Racing, 459
 #20 Nolen Racing, 433

See also
 2018 USAC AMSOIL National Sprint Car Championship
 2018 USAC P1 Insurance National Midget Championship

References

USAC Silver Crown Series
United States Auto Club